Chris Brase (born 1962) is a Democratic politician, who represented the 46th District in the Iowa Senate from 2013 until 2017. Brase served on the Agriculture, Labor and Business Relations, Local Government, Natural Resources and Environment, and Transportation Committees.

Before running for public office, Brase was a firefighter and paramedic for 21 years. Brase served as president and vice-president of the Muscatine Association of Firefighters Local 608.

References

External links
Project Vote Smart Profile
Legislative page

Living people
People from Scott County, Iowa
Democratic Party Iowa state senators
Iowa State University alumni
People from Muscatine, Iowa
21st-century American politicians
1962 births